Hans Braun  (14 May 1917 – 2 May 1992) was an Austrian operatic baritone. He was a long-term member of the Vienna State Opera and appeared in leading roles such as Mozart's Count Almaviva and Wagner's Wolfram, including in major European opera houses and festivals.

Life 
Born in Vienna, Braun was a member of the Peterlini-Sängerknaben in his home town. He studied voice at the Wiener Musikakademie with Hermann Gallos and Hans Duhan. He made his debut in 1938. From 1943 to 1945 he had an engagement at the Stadttheater Königsberg in today's Kaliningrad. From 1945, he was a member of the Vienna State Opera, to which he belonged until 1979. After singing secondary roles in the beginning, he soon advanced to leading roles, performing 75 roles there. At the Salzburg Festival, he first appeared as a concert singer, then in 1949 and 1950 as the Minister in Beethoven's Fidelio, in 1950 also as Olivier in Capriccio by Richard Strauss and Tarquinius in Benjamin Britten's The Rape of Lucretia.

Braun made guest appearances at many European opera houses. He appeared at the Royal Opera House in London as Count Almaviva in Mozart's Le nozze di Figaro in 1949 and as Orest in Elektra by Richard Strauss in 1953, which he also sang at the Maggio Musicale Fiorentino that year. In 1950, he performed as Wolfram in Wagner's Tannhaüser at La Scala in Milan. He appeared also in Naples, Berlin, Munich and Hamburg, and at the Bayreuth Festival, where he performed the role of the Heerrufer in Lohengrin.

Braun was briefly married to his colleague .

Braun died in Vienna at age 74.

Honours 
 1977: Honorary member of the Vienna State Opera

Further reading 
 Uwe Harten: Braun, Hans. In Oesterreichisches Musiklexikon. Online edition, Vienna 2002 ff., ; Print edition: volume 1, edition of the Austrian Academy of Sciences, Vienna 2002, .

References

External links 
 

1917 births
1992 deaths
Musicians from Vienna
Austrian operatic baritones
Recipients of the Austrian Cross of Honour for Science and Art, 1st class
20th-century Austrian male opera singers